Miriam Katamanda  (born 25 October 1991) is a Zambian footballer who plays as a goalkeeper for the Zambia women's national football team. She was part of the team at the 2014 African Women's Championship. On club level she played for Red Arrows F.C. in Zambia.

References

1991 births
Living people
Zambian women's footballers
Zambia women's international footballers
Place of birth missing (living people)
Women's association football goalkeepers
Red Arrows F.C. players